Mount Madison is a prominent, largely ice-covered mountain in Antarctica, rising to   west of Cape Selborne, on the south side of Byrd Glacier. It was named by the Advisory Committee on Antarctic Names (US-ACAN) for Lieutenant Commander Douglas W. Madison, aide to the Commander, U.S. Naval Support Force Antarctica, 1961–62, and Public Information Officer, 1963–64.

Madison Terrace is a rectangular terrace, 6 nautical miles (11 km) long and 3 nautical miles (6 km) wide, abutting the south part of Mount Madison on Shackleton Coast. Ice draining from Mount Madison covers the terrace, which terminates in a line of icefalls within Couzens Bay. Named by US-ACAN in association with Mount Madison.

See also
Contortion Spur

References

Mountains of the Ross Dependency
Shackleton Coast